Recording angels are angels in Judaic, Christian, and Islamic angelology. Recording angels are assigned by God with the task of recording the events, actions, and prayers of each individual human. This includes bad sins, and good deeds.

Description
In the Book of Malachi 3:16, the prophet describes Heaven as having conferring angels, and "The Lord took note and listened, and a book of remembrance was written before him of those who revered the Lord and thought on his name." In Judaic thought, Gabriel is the principal recording angel, as shown in Ezekiel 9:3-4, where he is "the man clothed in linen, who had the writing case at his side" who put the mark of Passover on Jewish houses in Egypt.

In the Secrets of Enoch (also known as Second Enoch, or Slavonic Enoch) the recording angel is named Pravuil or Vretil: "And the Lord summoned one of his archangels by name Pravuil, whose knowledge was quicker in wisdom than the other archangels, who wrote all the deeds of the Lord..."

See also
 List of angels in theology
The Recording Angel, statue in Waupun, Wisconsin, United States

References

External links

Jewish Encyclopedia Online

Angels in Judaism
Angels in Christianity
Angels in Islam
Classes of angels